Cumberland Boroughs, an electoral district of the Legislative Assembly in the Australian state of New South Wales was created in 1856 and abolished in 1859.


Election results

1858

1856

References

New South Wales state electoral results by district